The Bentley Flying Spur is a full-sized high-performance luxury saloon produced by Bentley Motors Limited since 2005. It is the four-door grand tourer variant of the Bentley Continental GT coupé.

The Flying Spur is handcrafted at Bentley's factory in Crewe, England. Each bespoke saloon takes more than 100 hours to assemble completely by hand. Briefly, due to lack of capacity at the Crewe factory upon the car's introduction, 1,358 units of the first generation Flying Spur destined for markets other than the United States and United Kingdom were built at Volkswagen's Transparent Factory in Dresden, Germany. This arrangement ended in early 2007, when all assembly works reverted to Crewe in England.



First generation (2005–2013)

Overview
The first-generation Flying Spur was officially unveiled at the 75th Geneva Motor Show in March 2005. Torsen-based permanent all-wheel drive system was standard on the Flying Spur. It also has Adaptive Air Suspension and Continuous Damping Control as standard. At that time, it was the world's fastest and most powerful production saloon.

Sales of the first-generation Flying Spur began in late 2005. During the first full-year sales of the Flying Spur, the number of deliveries exceeded 4,000 units. The Speed model of the Flying Spur was introduced in 2008 as a higher performance variant with revised ceramic disc brakes and tuned to produce 602 horsepower. The total production of the first generation Flying Spur was 19,786 units while only a limited number of 1,155 units of the Speed model were ever made.

Engines

Transmissions

The steering column-mounted paddle shifters enable direct access to the six-speed gearbox when the ZF transmission is in "S" or sports mode.

Second generation (2013–2019)

Flying Spur W12 (2013–2019)
The second generation Flying Spur was unveiled in March 2013 at the 2013 Geneva Motor Show.

The "Continental" prefix was omitted; according to Bentley's designers, this was a conscious attempt to take the Flying Spur in a more opulent direction and distance it from the more driver-oriented, two-door Continental GT range (historically, the Continental name has generally been used by Bentley to refer to models of a "sporting" nature). Despite this, the Flying Spur and Continental GT continue to share the same engineering platform.

Flying Spur V8 (2013–2019)

Engines

Transmissions

Third generation (2019–present)

The third-generation Flying Spur was unveiled in June 2019. The car has been completely overhauled and is built on a brand-new platform, resembling the current Continental GT. The front received a new grille with vertical slats, akin to those of Rolls-Royce era Bentleys, while the rear features new taillights that incorporate a B motif. The hood ornament is now illuminated at night, electrically deployable, and capable of meeting pedestrian impact requirements. The interior boasts a rotating  display and an all-new Touch Screen remote that allows rear occupants to control several systems

Rear-wheel steering is new and is accompanied by air springs with 60 percent more volume than its predecessor. The all-wheel-drive system is also new and uses an electronically controlled clutch pack. Compared to the second generation model, the new Flying Spur gets close to 130 mm additional wheelbase.

There are three powertrains available for the Flying Spur: a 6.0 L W12, a 4.0 L V8, and plug-in hybrid, all of which have twin turbos. It produces 626 horsepower and 664 pound-feet of torque. The V8 variant produces 549 horsepower and 568 pound-feet of torque and accelerates from 0-62 mph in 4.1 seconds, with a top speed of 198 mph. The plug-in hybrid variant uses a 2.9 liter V6 engine combined with a 14.1 kilowatt-hour battery to deliver a claimed electric range of 40 kilometers (25 miles) and a 0-60 time of 4.1 seconds.

The Flying Spur became the only Bentley sedan model, as production of the Mulsanne ended in the second quarter of 2020 without a direct successor.

In March 2021, Bentley issued a recall for a single Flying Spur due to an improper welding process used on the fuel tank.

References

External links

 Bentley pages: Continental Flying Spur, Continental Flying Spur Speed, Flying Spur, Flying Spur W12 Mulliner
 BENTLEY Continental Flying Spur Speed – 2009 Test drive and review by Autoevolution.com
 Press kit: 2009 Continental Flying Spur/Continental Flying Spur Speed, Flying Spur , Bentley Flying Spur, Bentley

2010s cars
All-wheel-drive vehicles
Flying Spur (2005)
Cars introduced in 2005
Full-size vehicles
Limousines
Luxury vehicles
Police vehicles
Sports sedans